Alessandra Casella is an economist, researcher, professor, and author. Currently, she is an Economics and Political Science professor at Columbia University.

Life 
Casella received her bachelor's degree with a summa cum laude in Economics and Social Sciences from Bocconi University, Milan, in March 1983. She furthered her studies at Massachusetts Institute of Technology (MIT), where she received her master's degree and Ph.D. in economics, 1988. Her thesis focused on hyperinflation and the real exchange rates and supply shocks in the economy. After graduating, Casella's research continues to focus on economics, with more specific interests in public economics, experimental economics, and political economy.

In 2019, Casella was the director of the Columbia Laboratory for the Social Sciences, and a fellow in both the National Bureau of Economic Research in Cambridge and the British Center for Economic Policy Research. She is the author of two books: Networks and Markets. Contributions from Economics and Sociology and Storable Votes: Protecting the Minority Voice.

Career

Academic 
Casella started her teaching career at UC Berkeley as an assistant professor from 1987 to 1993. From 1996 to 2010, she was the part-time Director of Studies at the École des Hautes Études en Sciences Sociales (EHESS, School for Advanced Studies in the Social Sciences) based in Paris, France. In the time between her career in UC Berkeley and Directorship at EHESS, Casella became an associate Professor of Economics at Columbia University, New York, from 1993 till 1997. Her career with Columbia University continued where she eventually became a professor of economics at Columbia University in 1997 until current. Since then, Casella has taught Ph.D. courses in Experimental Methods in Political Economy and Special Topics in Political Economics. She has also taught undergraduate classes in political economy and experimental economics. Since 2017, Casella has also become a Professor of Political Science at Columbia University.

Journals 

 1996: Invited editor for the European Economic Review. A special issue on the domain of the state
 2007: Invited editor for the Journal of Economic Behavior and Organization. A special issue in honor of Economist Alan Kirman
 2004–2009: Associate Editor for the Journal of Public Economic Theory 
 2013–2017: On the Editorial Board for the Journal of Experimental Political Science 
 2016–current: Associate Editor for the American Economic Review

Others 

 1988–1997: Faculty Research Fellow at the National Bureau of Economic Research, Cambridge
 1988: Research Fellow at the Center for Economic Policy Research, London
 1994–1995: Panel member at Economic Policy
 1997: Research associate at National Bureau of Economic Research, Cambridge
 2004–2006: Economics panel member at the National Science Foundation 
 2012: Director at Columbia Experimental Laboratory for Social Sciences
 2013–2016: Scientific Board member at AXA Research Fund

Fellowships

 Fall 1989: National Bureau of Economic Research, Ford Foundation Fellowship
 1990–1991: Hoover Institution, Stanford University, National Fellow
 1992–1993: Institute for Policy Reform, Washington, D.C., Junior Research Fellow
 1993: German Marshall Fund of the United States Fellowship
 1997–1998: Russell Sage Foundation, New York, N.Y., Fellow
 2004–2005: Institute for Advanced Study, Princeton, N.J., Member
 2006–2007: John Simon Guggenheim Fellow
 2012–2013: Straus Institute Fellow, NYU Law School

Academic publications

Working papers 

 “Trading Votes for Votes. An Experiment” (with Thomas Palfrey), May 2017 
 “Storable Votes and Quadratic Voting. An Experiment on Four California Propositions” (with Luis Sanchez), in progress.

Books 

 Storable Votes: Protecting the Minority Voice. Oxford University Press, New York, 2012. Print 
 Networks and Markets. Contributions from Economics and Sociology (With James Raunch), Russell Sage Foundation, New York, 2001.

References 

Living people
Year of birth missing (living people)
Place of birth missing (living people)
Columbia University faculty
20th-century American economists
21st-century American economists
American women economists
MIT School of Humanities, Arts, and Social Sciences alumni
Bocconi University alumni
University of California, Berkeley College of Letters and Science faculty
20th-century American women
21st-century American women